Oman–Pakistan relations are warm and cooperative. Oman has an embassy in Islamabad and a Consulate-General in Karachi, whereas Pakistan has an embassy in Muscat.

Oman is the nearest Arab country to Pakistan, because of this, they both share a maritime boundary with each other. 30% of Omanis are of Balochi origin from Pakistan's Balochistan province, having settled in Oman over a hundred years ago. Gwadar was formerly part of Oman but was sold to Pakistan on 8 September 1958. It was integrated within Balochistan on 1 July 1977 and became a full sub-division of the Gwadar District. There are over 85,000 Pakistani immigrants resident in Oman.

Oman and Pakistan cooperate economically, with bilateral trade of $331 million as of 2008–2009. The Pakistan-Oman Joint Investment Company promotes trade between Oman and Pakistan.

The countries also cooperate militarily, with joint exercises and defence procurement.

Arabian Sea diplomacy
Oman agreed to a transaction for Gwadar Port which is now being developed as a part of China-Pakistan Economic Corridor. Oman and Pakistan also co-operated regarding Pakistan's extended continental shelf zone, Pakistan's Foreign affairs adviser Sartaj Aziz thanked Oman for their co-operation regarding extension of Pakistan's territorial waters from 240,000 km2 to an additional 50,000 km2.

See also 
 Pakistanis in Oman

Links 
 http://www.pakoman.com/

References

 
Pakistan
Bilateral relations of Pakistan